A truckmount carpet cleaner is a carpet and upholstery cleaning unit that is generally mounted to the floor of a van or trailer. Its cleaning method is hot water extraction. The operator would park the van near the premises, connect the vacuum hose and solution line hose into the machine, bring the hoses into the building, and connect a carpet cleaning wand to the end of the hoses.

Benefits to the operator and the client 
Van powered power take-off (PTO) units are available on the market.

Heat exchanger 

The heat exchanger method uses heat naturally generated by the normal operation of the engine and in some cases, vacuum pump components of the system.  Typically, water is routed through a heat exchanger, which consists of two separate sections.  In one section, the heat is routed.  In the second section, the water passes through. The two sections share two sides of common surfaces inside the exchanger; therefore heat is transferred from the "heat side" section with higher temperature to the "solution side" section with lower temperature.

There are two basic types of heat exchangers. One, named, "shell and coil", has fluid passing through a coil of tubing which is contained in a "shell", or container, through which heat is routed. The other, called "shell and tube", contains several parallel tubes running from one end of the "shell" to the other.  In the shell and tube configuration, heat travels through the parallel tubes and water travels through the shell.

Power 
Traditionally, truckmount carpet cleaning machines have been more powerful than portable carpet cleaning units. Although recent changes in technology have allowed portable manufacturers to approach the power of truckmount carpet cleaning machines, to date truckmounts are more powerful as they produce the cleaning power from an engine and electric portables generate the cleaning power from an electrical socket in the customers home.

The primary advantage of a truckmount lies with the carpet cleaning customer, as truckmounts do not need to use the customer's electricity or hot water so it means no costly electric and gas bills in the post long after the carpet cleaning company have left your home.

Truckmounts also have a waste tank fitted so the technician can take the dirty water away and it does not end up down your sink or toilet, quick setup and easy use of the truckmount makes it preferable among professional cleaners. Regrettably only a small percentage of carpet cleaning companies use truckmounts as the cost is usually between $10,000 to $35,000 US, and is therefore out of reach for many small companies and professionals. Currently, it is estimated that only 28% of professional carpet cleaners use truckmount carpet cleaning machines.

Many truckmount manufacturers are making environmental improvements such as LPG conversions or changes to make the machines use less petrol or diesel which makes them more environmentally friendly

Most carpet manufacturers recommend a regular cleaning by hot water extraction, which is the method for carpet cleaning that is employed by truckmount carpet cleaners.

Main components of a truckmount 
A petrol or diesel fueled engine powers a high pressure pump and vacuum blower by direct drive.
The engine will generally have a starter motor fitted alone with a pull starter and an alternator that charges the battery and supplies 12 volt DC current to all the electrical components.  An on demand electrical fuel pump is bolted to the fuel tank or the machine and supplies the carburetor or injectors on the engine with a fuel tank that is normally fitted to the chassis of the van to supply the fuel pump.

A PTO or power take-off unit has the same driven components as a petrol or diesel driven unit except that the unit takes mechanical power from the vehicles engine via a specially fitted power take off unit which is usually fitted to the vehicle transmission. The power is usually transmitted via a drive shaft or hydraulic pump and motor. Heating the solution is either by a vehicle exhaust heat exchanger, coolant heater or LPG fired heater. The advantage is quieter running and lighter weight in addition to not having to maintain a second engine. The disadvantages are putting extra running hours on the vehicle engine and transmission. The PTO system is also usually vehicle specific so transferring the truckmount to another make or model of vehicle will require a new PTO system to be fitted.

The vacuum blower lifts the dirty water from the carpet.

The high pressure water pump pumps heated water and chemical onto the carpet.

A heat exchanger or a water heater are fitted to the machine to heat the water up through the exhaust manifold system. Instead of a heat exchanger, some machines have a thermostat-controlled boiler that runs on liquefied petroleum gas (LPG).

A chemical injection system is in place that injects carpet cleaning chemical into the solution line on the low pressure or high pressure side, depending upon the model of the machine.

Most machines have a mixer tank/water box which is a holding tank to store water for the high pressure pump on demand.

Some machines have a magnetic water softener fitted to prevent buildup of minerals to protect the plumbing components.
Some systems in America fit a deionizer to the plumbing to purify the water in order to protect the plumbing components and to give greater cleaning effect.

A waste tank, fitted to the floor of the van, holds dirty water picked up by the suction hose powered by the vacuum blower.

A vacuum hose connects to the carpet cleaning wand, delivering the dirty water to the waste tank, and a solution hose that pumps high pressure water and chemical from the high pressure system to the carpet cleaning wand.

Truckmount accessories 
Cleaning tools connect to the vacuum and solution hose.  Cleaning attachments such as upholstery tools for upholstery cleaning, and power heads and rotary tools for carpet, can also be used to further increase productivity and enhanced results on certain carpet types and soil conditions. The attachments to the machine are also an important factor in delivering the right amount of solution and also the extraction of the solution. A well-equipped operator will often have a large percentage of the cost of the machine invested in accessories, in order to achieve optimum results.

A hose reel can be bolted to the floor of the van for storing the vacuum and solution hoses. Recently, electric rewind hose reels have been introduced to allow for quicker hose storage.

A main water tank is often fitted to the floor of the van. It holds fresh water, supplying water directly to the high pressure pump or the mixer tank.  When such a water tank is installed, an on-demand supply pump is bolted to the main water tank, supplying water to the mixer tank or high pressure pump.

Where limited space is available, and a fresh water tank cannot be fitted, the machine will still retain its demand tank, but it will be fed from an outdoor "garden" water tap via a separate supply hose reel. This, of course, requires that the property has an external cold water tap, which can be hard to find on some commercial sites. However, by carrying a range of different fittings, a tap key (for taps that have their handle removed to avoid unwanted water usage), and enough hose on the reel, the cleaner will usually be able to handle this situation.

See also

 List of vacuum cleaners

References

Vacuum cleaners